Jacqueline Arleny Solís-Gutiérrez (born December 22, 1988 in Sacatepéquez) is a judoka from Guatemala.

Bio
She was awarded by Guatemalan NOC as the best female sportsman between April 2008 and April 2009 period in Guatemala.

Her younger sister Evelyn is also a judoka.

Judo
Her only medal from a big competition is silver at Pan American Judo Championships in Buenos Aires. It was her first competition outside Central America.

Achievements

References

External links
 
 Facebook

1988 births
Living people
Guatemalan female judoka
Judoka at the 2019 Pan American Games
Pan American Games competitors for Guatemala